Tang Tang is a platform game released in arcades in 2000 by the Korean company Excellent Soft Design (ESD). As one of four space soldiers, your duty is to kill enemies and make platforms to get to certain places, making the game a unique experience in the fact that you can actually create different versions of the level. The game plays similarly to Solomon's Key. A port for the Game Boy Advance was developed by the American company GameVision Corporation, who also released the arcade version in North America. It was released by Take-Two Interactive in North America and Europe.

Reception
The GBA version currently has a Metacritic score of 56%, indicating "mixed or average reviews".
Frank Provo of GameSpot on the other hand gave it a negative review of 4.8/10, indicating "poor". He commented on the game, calling it "an uninspiring puzzle game with an equally lifeless plot". He said the levels all felt the same and criticized the control scheme.
Andrew Blanchard of EAGB Advance gave the Game Boy Advance version a positive review of 4/5 stars, indicating "Good!" He praised the simple controls, colorful graphics, and fast-paced music.

References

External links

2000 video games
Arcade video games
Game Boy Advance games
Platform games
Video games developed in South Korea